The Journal of Health Psychology is a peer-reviewed academic journal covering all aspects of health psychology. The Founder Editor is David F Marks who also served as editor-in-chief from 1996-2021. The current Co-Editor Team comprises Abigail Locke, Gareth Treharne and Rachel Annunziato. The journal publishes reports of empirical studies, critical reviews of the literature, contributions related to theory, open peer commentary articles and editorials on what are deemed to be significant issues. The journal was established in 1996 and is published by SAGE Publications.

Special issue on the PACE trial  

In July 2017, the Journal of Health Psychology published an entire issue devoted to the controversial PACE trial for ME/chronic fatigue syndrome. The articles were mostly critical of the PACE trial, and the journal concluded that "the results are, at best, unreliable, and at worst manipulated to produce a positive-looking outcome". However, three editorial board members of the journal, all of whom were alleged to have conflicts of interest, resigned in protest, claiming that the articles were biased and one-sided. In response, an associate editor of the journal James C. Coyne attacked the three resigning board members, calling one a "disgusting old fart neoliberal hypocrite", and telling another to "f*** off...you ol’ sleazebag". Coyne left the editorial board as a consequence.

In a Parliamentary debate on ME (#MEDebate) on 21 June 2018, the Journal of Health Psychology was referred to by Sir Edward Davey MP as a source of critical evidence on ME treatment.

Abstracting and indexing
This journal is abstracted and indexed in:

According to the Journal Citation Reports, the journal has a 2021 impact factor of 3.789.

See also
Health psychology
 Health Psychology (journal)
Occupational health psychology

References

External links
 

Health psychology journals
SAGE Publishing academic journals
Publications established in 1996
English-language journals
Journals published between 13 and 25 times per year